Wallace Huo Chien-hwa (born 26 December 1979) is a Taiwanese actor, singer and producer. He is known for his roles in At Dolphin Bay (2003), Chinese Paladin 3 (2009), Swordsman (2013), Battle of Changsha (2014), The Journey of Flower (2015), Love Me If You Dare (2015) and Ruyi's Royal Love in the Palace (2018)

Huo ranked 82nd on Forbes China Celebrity 100 list in 2014, 48th in 2015, 22nd in 2017, and 66th in 2019.

Early life
Huo was born in Taipei, Taiwan on 26 December 1979 to Liu Yu and Huo Chao-Ku. He has one brother, Huo Chien-yuan. His family originated from Shandong; his parents were natives of Longkou and Tianjin respectively. His grandfather was a follower of Sun Yat-sen and in October 1949, his family moved to Taiwan. Both his parents worked in the court system and his brother is a police officer. His parents divorced when he was young.

Huo once aspired to be a basketball player but then turned to singing in his early teenage days. With the goal of becoming a singer, Huo joined the entertainment business at the age of 17, as the assistant of Taiwanese TV host Sam Tseng.

Career

2002–2008: Beginnings and Rising popularity
Huo became one of the two leading actors in the drama Star (2002).

Huo rose to fame from the idol drama At Dolphin Bay (2003), which achieved a peak rating of 5.11 and became the most popular idol drama of the year. 
His role as the talented and capable music director Zhong Xiaogang brought him significant popularity in Taiwan. He was then in great demand by many producers and was cast in seven idol dramas in the same year (a record yet to be broken).

In 2004, Huo released his first ever solo album Start.  Owing to his inability to cope with the excessive spotlight during the advertising of the album, he decided to focus on acting thereafter.

In 2005, Huo starred in his first wuxia drama The Royal Swordsmen directed by Wong Jing.
His melancholic portrayal of Guihai Yidao received rave reviews from fans and audiences. It proved to be an important turning point of his career, as it introduced him to mainland audiences. The same year, Huo made his big screen debut in the movie Hands in the Hair alongside actress Rosamund Kwan.

Huo then took the leading role in various dramas, including Sound of Colors alongside actress Ruby Lin, Romance of Red Dust opposite Shu Qi, and Emerald on the Roof with Sun Li. Huo expressed that his role in Emerald on the Roof had taught him how to act, and has a deep impact on him. Huo also starred in kungfu comedy Love at First Fight, taking on an eccentric and crazy role. His exaggerated expressions and comedic acting showed his ability to take on different roles.

2009–2014: Rising popularity in China
In 2009, Huo rose to mainstream popularity with the hit xianxia drama Chinese Paladin 3, an adaptation from the video game of the same title. His character Xu Changqing and romantic pairing with Tiffany Tang were loved by the audience, and established his popularity in China.

In 2011, Huo starred in period action drama The Vigilantes in Masks with Cecilia Liu; and historical drama The Glamorous Imperial Concubine wherein he played a cold and detached Emperor.
Due to the success of the dramas, Huo was awarded Most Influential Actor at the 2011 Youku Television Awards.

In 2012, Huo starred in acclaimed medical drama Inspire the Life. He then starred in Lord of Legal Advisors, a mystery series set in the Ming dynasty. The drama premiered in South Korea and became the second-highest viewed Chinese drama in the country after Scarlet Heart. It was subsequently broadcast in Taiwan in April 2013 and achieved high ratings as well.

In 2013, Huo starred in wuxia drama Swordsman, based on Jin Yong’s classic novel of the same Chinese title. He portrayed the character Linghu Chong. Swordsman was a commercial success and scored number one ratings on both TV and streaming websites; the success of the drama once again brought him to limelight.

In 2014, Huo starred in Perfect Couple, written by Tong Hua. It was Huo's first attempt at producing a drama series after the establishment of his own company Huajae Studio, and reunited him with Chinese Paladin 3 co-star Tiffany Tang. The drama topped online broadcast views, and Huo won the Most Popular Actor in the ancient drama genre at the 2014 China Student Television Festival.
Huo then starred in his first war drama, Battle of Changsha, directed by Magnolia Award winner Kong Sheng. Huo played a young soldier from a wealthy and renowned family who fought bravely at the front-lines for his country despite all oppositions. Battle of Changsha was a critical success, and was the highest rated drama on major streaming website Douban.

2015–present: Career peak

In 2015, Huo starred in xianxia drama The Journey of Flower with Zanilia Zhao. The drama was a huge success in China, achieving a peak rating of 3.89. It is also the first Chinese drama to surpass 20 billion online views. The success of The Journey of Flower brought Huo's career to a new high. 
He then starred in crime thriller Love Me If You Dare, which received positive reviews and an international following. Due to his success, Huo was chosen by China Newsweek as Artist of the Year. He was distinguished as one of the Most Influential People in China for 2015, a remarkable distinction since he is the only recipient of this award in the field of Performing Arts.

In 2016, Huo starred in historical medical drama  The Imperial Doctress, portraying Zhu Qizhen. It was one of the highest rated dramas that year, and Huo was awarded Most Popular Actor and Most Marketable Artist for his performance in The Imperial Doctress as well as Love Me If You Dare at the 1st China Television Drama Quality Ceremony. He next starred in the crime thriller Inside or Outside alongside Korean actor Jang Hyuk and Hong Kong star Simon Yam, as well as romantic comedy film Suddenly Seventeen and suspense thriller Hide and Seek.

In 2017, Huo starred in the science fiction suspense film Reset, produced by Jackie Chan and directed by Korean director, Chang; and war film Our Time Will Come, directed by award-winning director Ann Hui.

In 2018, Huo returned to the small screen in the palace drama Ruyi's Royal Love in the Palace playing the role of Qianlong Emperor.

In 2019, Huo starred in the period epic drama The Great Craftsman, reuniting with his Chinese Paladin 3 and Reset co-star Yang Mi. The same year, he starred in the romance drama film Somewhere Winter written by Rao Xueman.

Personal life
On 20 May 2016, Huo confirmed his relationship with actress Ruby Lin, his co-star in Sound of Colors (2006) and The Glamorous Imperial Concubine (2011). They were married in Bali on 31 July 2016, and held another wedding reception in Taipei on 2 August 2016. Their daughter was born in January 2017.

Huo is a close friend of actor Hu Ge.

Filmography

Film

Television series

Discography

Albums

Singles

Music video appearances

Awards and nominations

References

External links

Taiwanese male film actors
1979 births
Living people
Male actors from Taipei
Taiwanese Mandopop singers
Taiwanese idols
Taiwanese male television actors
21st-century Taiwanese male actors
Taiwanese television producers
21st-century Taiwanese singers